Laurent Neuville (born 15 July 1965) is a French swimmer who won a silver medal in the 4 × 100 m freestyle at the 1989 European Aquatics Championships. He finished sixth and fourth in the same event at the 1984 and 1988 Summer Olympics, respectively. Individually, he won a silver medal in the 100 m freestyle at the 1987 Mediterranean Games.

After retirement from senior swimming he was competing in the masters category and set world records in freestyle events. In 2012, he tried to revive the swimming race through Paris.

References

External links 
 

1965 births
Living people
Swimmers at the 1984 Summer Olympics
Swimmers at the 1988 Summer Olympics
Olympic swimmers of France
French male freestyle swimmers
European Aquatics Championships medalists in swimming
Mediterranean Games silver medalists for France
Mediterranean Games medalists in swimming
Swimmers at the 1987 Mediterranean Games